Cotaena phlegyropa is a species of sedge moths in the genus Cotaena. It was described by Edward Meyrick in 1915. It is found in Guyana and French Guiana.

References

Moths described in 1915
Glyphipterigidae